Kaliyugam is a 1973 Indian Malayalam film,  directed by K. S. Sethumadhavan and produced by M. O. Joseph. The film stars Sudheer, Bahadoor,  Jayabharathi, KPAC Lalitha, Adoor Bhasi and Muthukulam Raghavan Pillai in the lead roles. The film had musical score by G. Devarajan.

Cast

Sudheer
Bahadoor
Jayabharathi
KPAC Lalitha
Adoor Bhasi
Muthukulam Raghavan Pillai
Sankaradi
Sreelatha Namboothiri
T. R. Omana
Pala Thankam
Paravoor Bharathan
Philomina
Ponjikkara Kalyani Amma
S. A. Fareed
S. P. Pillai
Sreenu
Sujatha

Soundtrack
The music was composed by G. Devarajan and the lyrics were written by Vayalar.

References

External links
 

1973 films
1970s Malayalam-language films
Films directed by K. S. Sethumadhavan